Nikolai Nikolaevich Polikarpov (– 30 July 1944) was a Soviet aeronautical engineer and aircraft designer, known as the "King of Fighters". He designed the I-15 series of fighters, and the I-16 Ishak ( phonetically close to its  or  designation) "Little Donkey" fighter.

Biography
Polikarpov was born in the village of Georgievskoye near Livny in Oryol Governorate. He was the son of a village priest in the Russian Orthodox Church. He initially also trained for the priesthood and studied at the Oryol Seminary before moving to Saint Petersburg Polytechnical University in 1911, where he became fascinated with the fledgling aviation work being carried out under the shipbuilding department. Polikarpov graduated in 1916 and went to work for Igor Sikorski, the head of production at the Russian Baltic Carriage Factory. While working for Sikorski, Polikarpov helped design the massive Ilya Muromets four-engine bomber for the Imperial Russian Air Force.

Soviet career 
Polikarpov stayed in Russia after the Russian Revolution and rose to become head of the technical department Dux Aircraft factory in 1923. Polikarpov was responsible for some of the first indigenous aircraft designs in the Soviet Union during the 1920s, including the I-1 fighter (1923), R-1 reconnaissance plane (1927), U-2 utility biplane (1927–1928), I-3 fighter (1928), R-5 reconnaissance bomber (1928). Notably, the U-2, Russian nickname Kukuruznik, loosely translated: crop-duster, (post 1944 designation Po-2), remained in mainstream production until 1952 and over 30,000 examples were produced.

In 1928, under provisions of the five-year plan for experimental aircraft design, Polikarpov was assigned to develop the primarily wooden I-6 fighter for delivery by mid-1930. The plan was unrealistic and failed. As such, in October 1929, Polikarpov and around other 450 aircraft designers and engineers were arrested on fabricated charges of sabotage and counter-revolutionary activities, after which he was sentenced to death. In December, after two months of waiting for execution, he was transferred to a Special Design Bureau of OGPU set at Butyrka prison and had the sentence changed to 10 years of forced labor. Polikarpov and the others were moved to Central Design Bureau 39 (TsKB-39) to complete the I-5 project. After a successful demonstration of the new design, the sentence was changed to a conditional one, and in July 1931 he was granted amnesty together with a group of other convicts. It was not until de-Stalinization in 1956 that the criminal charges were officially dropped posthumously.

After the release he initially worked with Pavel Sukhoi since 1931, developing the I-16 in 1933 and I-15 in 1934. Then he worked under Ilyushin in 1937. In 1938, he established an independent design bureau. In 1939, he completed work on the I-153. In 1939, he was ordered to make a trip to Nazi Germany. In his absence, his plant director and chief engineer, along with design engineer Mikhail Gurevich put forth a proposal for a new fighter, the I-200, and received approval to create a new Design Bureau under the leadership of Artem Mikoyan, whose brother Anastas Mikoyan was a senior politician under Joseph Stalin. On his return, Polikarpov found that his Bureau no longer existed, with his engineers at the new MiG bureau. Nine years after his death, in 1953, his plant was given over to the Sukhoi bureau.

Polikarpov was subsequently appointed professor at the Moscow Aviation Institute in 1943. He died on 30 July 1944 from stomach cancer. He is buried in Novodevichy Cemetery in Moscow.

Polikarpov was a recipient of numerous awards, including the Stalin Prize (1941, 1943) and Hero of Socialist Labor (1940). Polikarpov Peak in the Pamir Mountains was named after him.

See also 
 Polikarpov design bureau

References

Bibliography 
 
 
 
 
 Biography of Polikarpov at website of the Russian Ministry of Defense

1892 births
1944 deaths
People from Livensky District
People from Oryol Governorate
Burials at Novodevichy Cemetery
Soviet aerospace engineers
Soviet inventors
Soviet rehabilitations
Sharashka inmates
Heroes of Socialist Labour
Peter the Great St. Petersburg Polytechnic University alumni
Stalin Prize winners
Deaths from cancer in the Soviet Union
Deaths from stomach cancer
Academic staff of Moscow Aviation Institute